Pindad Maung is an all-terrain, all-wheel drive light vehicle produced by Pindad. Initially designed as a military light utility-type vehicle, civilian versions are also available. The name Maung means "tiger" in Sundanese.

Description
The Maung is a light tactical all-wheel drive vehicle that in standard configuration is capable of carrying four personnel. The vehicle is a four-door configuration (with removable doors), with a side-hinged tailgate onto which a spare wheel/tyre can be mounted. In standard configuration the vehicle is fitted with a removeable soft top. The front windscreen folds forward onto the bonnet. 

This is coupled to a 6-speed manual gearbox. Suspension is independent for the front axle, leaf springs for the rear. It has been suggested the chassis may be taken from the Toyota Hilux. For the civilian version, the engine may use Isuzu 2.5-litre engine like those used in Isuzu D-Max.

The third version of Maung was named by Joko Widodo on 18 January 2023. The interior of the vehicle was taken from Isuzu MU-X, but the engine used is the Toyota Hilux engine.

Development
Development of the Pindad Maung traces back to 2018. At that time the name of the vehicle was Bima M-31, and the originator of the idea was the Commander of the Infantry Armament Center (Danpussenif) Surawahadi. Actual development was carried out by PT Pindad (Persero).

The Minister of Defense Prabowo Subianto is understood to have contracted 500 units of the vehicle from PT Pindad. He stated the purchase of vehicles from Pindad was an effort to revive Indonesia's domestic industry. On Wednesday, 13 January 2021, Defense Minister Prabowo Subianto officially handed over the first 40 units to the Army Chief of Staff, General Andika Perkasa. The handover was witnessed by the Indonesian Air Force Chief of Staff, the Indonesian Navy Chief of Staff, as well as high ranking TNI officials.

The Maung is offered in two versions, military and civilian. On 18 January 2023, the mass production version of Maung was introduced to the public, previously called Morino MV Cruiser at the Indodefence 2022 in November 2022. Morino stands for Motor Rekacipta Indonesia (lit. Indonesian-invented vehicle), but this name is no longer used after being given a new name by Joko Widodo.

User 

 : 5,500 units ordered, 40 units have been delivered to Indonesian Army. Several are ordered by Mobile Brigade Corps of Indonesian Police. As of May 2021, 100 civilian version has been ordered.

See also

 Pindad MV2
 P2 (armoured vehicle) 
 Indonesian Light Strike Vehicle

Similar vehicles

 Weststar GK-M1, Malaysian military light vehicle
 Cendana Auto Rover, Malaysian military light vehicle
 Humvee, US military light vehicle
 Dongfeng EQ2050, Chinese military vehicle

References

External link 
 Pindad Maung di laman web Pindad

Post–Cold War military equipment of Indonesia
All-wheel-drive vehicles
Military trucks
Off-road vehicles
Military vehicles introduced in the 2020s
Military light utility vehicles
Armoured cars
Military vehicles of Indonesia